Lewis White Beck (September 26, 1913 – June 7, 1997) was an American philosopher and scholar of German philosophy.  Beck was Burbank Professor of Intellectual and Moral Philosophy at the University of Rochester and served as the Philosophy Department chair there from 1949 to 1966.  He translated several of Immanuel Kant's works, such as the Critique of Practical Reason, and was the author of Studies in the Philosophy of Kant (1965).

Biography
Born in Griffin, Georgia, Beck received his bachelor's degree from Emory University in 1934, his master's degree from Duke University in 1935, and his doctoral degree from Duke University in 1937.

Before moving to Rochester, he was an international student at the University of Berlin (1937–38; an interview about his experiences there appeared in The Atlanta Constitution, Sept. 18, 1938), an instructor at Emory University (1938–41), assistant professor at the University of Delaware (1941–46), and associate professor at Lehigh University (1946–48), eventually becoming professor (1948–49). He was elected a Fellow of the American Academy of Arts and Sciences in 1963.

He retired in 1979 and died at age 83 in Rochester, New York.

Selected publications

Books
 Philosophic Inquiry: An Introduction to Philosophy (1952)
 A Commentary on Kant's Critique of Practical Reason (1961)
 Six Secular Philosophers (1966)
 Early German Philosophy: Kant and His Predecessors (1969)
 The Actor and the Spectator (1975)
 Essays on Kant and Hume (1978)
 Mr. Boswell dines with Professor Kant (1979)

Translations
 Kant's Prolegomena to Any Future Metaphysics That Will Be Able to Present Itself as a Science 
 Kant's Critique of Practical Reason
 Kant's The Foundations of the Metaphysics of Morals

See also
American philosophy
List of American philosophers

References

External links
 "Philosopher, Scholar Lewis White Beck Dies" - University of Rochester press release.
 The contingent cathedral: notes on Lewis White Beck’s Early German Philosophy - Notes on, quotations from and summary of Beck's Early German Philosophy
 Lewis White Beck's publications on JSTOR.org

1913 births
1997 deaths

Duke University alumni
Emory University alumni
Emory University faculty
Fellows of the American Academy of Arts and Sciences
Lehigh University faculty
People from Griffin, Georgia
People from Spalding County, Georgia
Philosophers from Delaware
Philosophers from Georgia (U.S. state)
Philosophers from New York (state)
Philosophers from Pennsylvania
University of Delaware faculty
University of Rochester faculty